Seven special routes of U.S. Route 34 have existed and are found in Colorado and Iowa.

Estes Park business route

U.S. Highway 34 Business serves Estes Park, Colorado. Both of its termini are at US 34. The business route splits from the main route east of the Rocky Mountain National Park Fall River Entrance Station, in the western city limits of Estes Park and enters town on West Elkhorn Avenue. The main route continues around the northern edge of Estes park on Wonderview Avenue, passing a large number of motels. At Moraine Avenue, It joins US 36 in downtown Estes Park. The business route was established in 1964.

Greeley business route
U.S. Highway 34 Business serves Greeley, Colorado. Both Termini are at US 34. It leaves US 34 and becomes 10th Street in Greeley. It splits off into two parallel one way streets until it intersects US 85 Business/8th Avenue. US 34 Business is  then concurrent with US 85 Business heading south for around 1 mile until US 34 Business turns east on 18th Street, and continues until it meets US 34 again.

Glenwood business route

Chariton business route

Ottumwa business route

Fairfield business route

Westwood–Mount Pleasant business route

References

34
34
34
34
S34
34